The Creek Fire was a large wildfire which started on September 4, 2020, near Shaver Lake, California, and became one of the largest fires of the 2020 California wildfire season. The fire burned  and was declared 100% contained on December 24, 2020. The fire burned mostly in the Sierra National Forest. The Creek Fire was the fifth-largest wildfire in modern California history, and the second-largest single fire not part of a greater complex. The fire necessitated the rescue of hundreds of people by National Guard helicopters. Evacuations were issued in North Fork, Bass Lake, Big Creek, Shaver, Huntington Lake, Tollhouse and Auberry, California. Half the homes in Big Creek were reported to have been destroyed by the fire. The Creek Fire destroyed at least 856 buildings and cost over $193 million (2020 USD) in fire suppression costs, while the total property damage is currently unknown.

Events 

The fire began around 6:40 PM PDT on Friday, September 4, 2020, in the Big Creek drainage area between Shaver Lake and Huntington Lake, California. Driven by powerful diurnal up-canyon winds within the San Joaquin River drainage, the Creek Fire quickly became a firestorm. NASA documented the creation of a pyrocumulonimbus cloud believed to be one of the largest ever seen in the United States. The fire was fed in part by these cloud formations, which generated downdrafts that supplied the fire with additional oxygen and pushed it across fire lines. The fire has been characterized as a plume-dominated blaze, where the environment allows for the continued upward blowing of smoke and the vertical transfer of heat, causing extreme fire behavior, such as multiple fire tornadoes observed using Doppler weather radar data.

Reasons for this explosive behavior included strong, gusty winds pushing east from the Central Valley into the Sierra Nevada and a pileup of dead trees due to the 2011–17 California drought and subsequent bark beetle infestation. With over  burned on September 23, the Creek Fire became the largest single blaze in the history of California, though it was surpassed the following year by the 2021 Dixie Fire.

The Creek Fire also spawned two fire tornadoes on September 5; the first was rated EF2 near Huntington Lake with approximately 125 mph winds, and the second was rated EF1 near Mammoth Pool with approximately 100 mph winds. Damage included uprooted pine trees as well as stripped bark. These "firenadoes" formed due to the intense heat the fire had generated, which pulled in air, creating rotational vortices.

The fire had initially trapped about 1,000 people near Mammoth Pool Reservoir after it jumped the San Joaquin River, with at least 200 individuals trapped at a boat launch. The California National Guard, using CH-47 Chinook and UH-60 Black Hawk helicopters and night goggles, flew multiple sorties to evacuate people from near Mammoth Pool Reservoir. The Chinook flew three flights, carrying 67, 102, and 37 people each time (not including crew). The Black Hawk flew another three times, carrying 15, 22, and 21 people each time. Evacuees were taken to an airfield in Fresno.

Over the next month, the Creek Fire continued to grow in size, exceeding  on September 27. In October, most of the new growth in the Creek Fire was coming from the eastern flank of the fire, which was expanding towards Mono Hot Springs and Lake Thomas A Edison. In late October 2020, the Creek Fire became the fourth-largest fire in the recorded history of California.

Full containment was expected around November 30, however, the fire persisted for another month, before it was fully contained on December 24.

Impact 
On September 5, hours after the fire broke out, the Fresno County Sheriff's Office closed Shaver Lake, a popular destination for boating and camping. The California Highway Patrol also shut down California State Route 168 for access only to emergency responders and evacuees.

On September 7, California governor Gavin Newsom issued a state of emergency for the Creek Fire in the Fresno, Madera, and Mariposa counties, as the fire crossed State Route 168 and was rapidly moving southward, threatening the community of Shaver Lake. The town of Big Creek was already decimated on September 5. 1,000 firefighters were called to fight this fire, which was already  large with no containment, moving quickly towards cabins, homes, and shops.

Scores of people were airlifted from hiking trails within the Sierra National Forest in the early days of the fire, with at least 150 people and some dogs evacuated by September 8.

On September 9, at least 60 homes were destroyed and 278 commercial-residential structures were destroyed along with the historic Cressman's General Store, a local-landmark. On September 9, the fire reached explosives stored by the China Peak Mountain Resort that were used to control avalanches causing the cache to explode. Firefighters had been warned of the cache and evacuated prior to the fire reaching the explosive materials.

On September 22, the fire had destroyed more than 855 structures and forced the evacuation of over 30,000 people in Fresno and Madera Counties. Smoke from the fire, worsened the air quality in the Central Valley area and caused an increase in at-risk individuals and children to be affected by respiratory issues and an increase in the use and prescribing of inhalers. On September 17, the Boy Scouts of America - Southern Sierra Council announced that the fire had badly damaged Camp Kern, with some significant structures fully destroyed by the fire.

Multiple organizations and locations housed pets and livestock during the evacuations, such as the Fresno Fairgrounds, Clovis Rodeo Grounds and local high schools. The Red Cross organized hotel rooms for evacuees; group shelters were not an available option due to COVID-19 pandemic social distancing requirements.

Response 
On September 15, Gavin Newsom and California senator Kamala Harris travelled to Fresno County to survey Creek Fire damage. They were met with both supporters and protestors. They talked to first responders about their efforts to fight the fire, as well as wildfire evacuees. They also addressed climate change as a major problem facing California and the country, helping to fuel wildfires like the Creek Fire. However, an Auberry family accused the pair of using their property for photo-op purposes, merely to push their political agenda, before even the family themselves could survey the damage.

Fire growth and containment process

See also

 2020 California wildfires
 List of California wildfires

References

External links 

 Cal Fire incident page

2020 California wildfires
Wildfires in Fresno County, California
Wildfires in Madera County, California
September 2020 events in the United States